Johnny Grant may refer to:

 Johnny Grant (radio personality) (1923–2008), American radio personality and television producer; honorary mayor of Hollywood
 Johnny Grant (politician), Republican Georgia State Senator representing the 25th district of Georgia
 Johnny Grant, fur trapper and cattle baron, founder of the Grant-Kohrs Ranch
 Jonathan Grant (born 1993), known as Johnny, Canadian soccer player

See also
John Grant (disambiguation)